Leo Cortsen (born 13 July 1930) is a retired bantamweight Greco-Roman wrestler from Denmark. He competed in the 1952 Summer Olympics, but was eliminated in the second bout.

References

1930 births
Living people
Olympic wrestlers of Denmark
Wrestlers at the 1952 Summer Olympics
Danish male sport wrestlers
Sportspeople from Aarhus
20th-century Danish people